Samuel Cabrera Castañeda (15 August 1960 – 21 March 2022) was a Colombian professional road cyclist.

Cabrera died on 21 March 2022, after being struck by lightning while working on his farm.  He was 61.

Major results

1980
 1st Overall Vuelta a Guatemala
1981
 5th Overall Vuelta a Colombia
 7th Overall Tour de l'Avenir
1982
 1st Overall Vuelta Ciclista a Costa Rica
1st Stages 7 & 8
 1st Stage 7 Vuelta a Guatemala
 3rd Overall Clásico RCN
1983
 5th Overall Clásico RCN
 6th Overall Vuelta a Colombia
1985
 2nd Overall Vuelta a Cundinamarca
 3rd Overall Tour de l'Avenir
1st  Mountains classification
1988
 2nd Overall Vuelta a Venezuela
1st Stage 1
 2nd Overall Tour the Americas
1st Stage 1

Grand Tour general classification results timeline

References

1960 births
2022 deaths
Colombian male cyclists
People from Cundinamarca Department
Deaths from lightning strikes
20th-century Colombian people